Code First Girls is a Social Enterprise that provides free coding courses to women and non-binary people across the UK. Code First Girls helps companies recruit more women into tech by connecting them with newly trained female developers. Their community of coders, instructors, and mentors is one of the largest in the UK and as of 2022 they've trained over 50,000 women.

The organisation promotes gender diversity and female participation in the technology sector by offering free and paid training and courses for students and professional women who are wanting to re-train. They also support businesses to train staff and encourage levelling-up for female staff within organisations.

As of 2020, Code First Girls is reported to have provided in excess of £10 million worth of free coding courses to more than 18,000 women since 2013.

In 2017, Code First Girls announced the launch of the "Code First: Girls 20:20 campaign" with the aim to "train 20,000 women to code for free by the end of 2020". As of 2018, Code First: Girls have announced "2020 campaign partnerships" with the following companies: Bank of America Merrill Lynch; Goldman Sachs; KKR; Trainline; and OVH. The organisation announced Baroness Martha Lane-Fox and Dame Stephanie Shirley as supporting the campaign as ambassadors.

Programs 
According to the Code First Girls website, the organisation offers free and paid-for in-person and remote coding courses for women, as well as for companies across the UK and Ireland. It also provides corporate upskilling and reskilling programmes focused on employability for women in the tech workforce.

Free Community Courses - Career Kickstarter & Essentials 
Code First Girls runs free part-time coding courses for female/non-binary identifying young individuals across the UK and Ireland, branded as Career Kickstarter.

Individuals joining courses at a university are required to be a student at the host university. General coding courses are also delivered at corporate locations and are open to women with the following eligibility: Aged between 18-23; or Aged 18+ and currently studying; or Aged 18+ and completed their studies in the past 2 years.  After the 2020 coronavirus pandemic and subsequent lockdown, Code First Girls successfully pivoted to provide all of their courses online through video chat platforms and remote teaching techniques.
Since spring 2020, it has also offered free hour-long taster sessions called Essentials. These courses are open to the public and serve to introduce programming languages like Python, SQL, or HTML to coding beginners.

Subsidised Professionals Courses - Career Switcher 
Code First Girls' Career Switcher women's courses are fee paying. These courses are targeted at female professionals and teach participants web development, data science or python skills in small groups with hands-on attention from expert instructors. These courses are intended to help female professionals upskill within their current role or switch into a more tech-focused career.

History 
Code First Girls began in late 2012 as "a nine-week, free, part-time course to get female graduates from all walks of life not only interested in coding, but also better equipped to contribute to technical discussions in high-tech businesses".

Founded by Alice Bentinck and Matthew Clifford, Code First: Girls was created they recognised a lack of female applications for their pre-seed investment programme Entrepreneur First (EF). EF supports the development of Code First: Girls.

Bentinck claims that of the first cohort to complete Code First: Girls training, more than half of the women participants now self-identify as "technical" or working in software-development roles.

Amali de Alwis was announced as first Chief Executive Officer of the organisation on Wednesday 8 April 2015, taking over from Bentinck and Clifford.  In November 2018, Amali was named to the Financial Times' list of the 'Top 100 minority ethnic leaders in technology.'

Code First: Girls was included in the UK Government's "UK Digital Strategy" policy paper 2017 as a "programmes doing valuable and innovative work to help more women into tech".

Awards 
In 2016 Code First: Girls was nominated for a National Diversity Award.

In 2017 Code First: Girls won "e-Skills Initiative of the Year" at the Information Age "Women in IT awards".

References 

British companies established in 2012
Companies based in London
Coding schools
Women in computing
Technology companies based in London
Computer science education in the United Kingdom
Community interest companies